Super Stardust is a 1994 game developed by Bloodhouse and published for the Amiga (AGA) and Amiga CD32 by Team17. The game was ranked the 26th best game of all time by Amiga Power.

The CD32 version featured CD-DA soundtracks composed by Nicklas Renqvist and Niko Nyman (Slusnik Luna). The game was ported to PC under the name Super Stardust '96. Super Stardust is a sequel to Stardust. An enhanced remake, entitled Super Stardust HD, was released in 2007 for the PlayStation 3 and in 2008 for the PlayStation Portable and is available to download from the European and US PlayStation Store. The next sequel, Super Stardust Delta, was released for the PlayStation Vita.

Reception
A Next Generation reviewer gave it one out of five stars, chiefly criticizing its nature as an Asteroids clone, though he acknowledged that "the graphics are much more complex, the music is an added bonus, and the power-ups add a lot of spice ..."

Amiga Format rated the game 90%, saying: "As polished Asteroids clones go, Super Stardust is untouchable. The graphics are extraordinary and the gameplay matches them."

References

External links 
Team17's company website

1994 video games
Amiga games
Amiga 1200 games
Amiga CD32 games
DOS games
Multidirectional shooters
Team17 games
Video games developed in Finland
Housemarque games
Multiplayer and single-player video games
GameTek games